Saari means island in Finnish and may refer to
Saari (name)
Saari, Finland, a former municipality
Saari, Estonia, a village
Saari language in Cameroon
Tarujen Saari, a Finnish folk-rock group
Saari Bhool Hamari Thi, a 2013 Pakistani drama serial

See also
Sari (disambiguation)